Redmond Barry (by September 1696 – September 1750) was an Irish Member of Parliament.

In 1717 he was elected to sit in the Irish House of Commons for Dungarvan. In the next general election, in 1727, he was elected for both Tallow and Rathcormack, sitting for the latter until his death.

References
 

Year of birth uncertain
1696 births
1750 deaths

Irish MPs 1715–1727
Irish MPs 1727–1760
Members of the Parliament of Ireland (pre-1801) for County Waterford constituencies
Members of the Parliament of Ireland (pre-1801) for County Cork constituencies